Andreas Nilsson  (born 12 April 1990) is a Swedish handball player for Telekom Veszprém and the Swedish national team.

He competed for the Swedish national team at the 2012 Summer Olympics in London, winning a silver medal, and the 2016 Summer Olympics in Rio. Nilsson won the EHF Champions League with HSV Hamburg during the 2012–13 season.

On 12 June 2016 he was chosen as Swedish "Handballer of the Year".

Honours

Individual
 SEHA League All-Star Team Best Line Player: 2019–20

References

External links

1990 births
Living people
People from Trelleborg
Swedish male handball players
Olympic handball players of Sweden
Handball players at the 2012 Summer Olympics
Handball players at the 2016 Summer Olympics
Olympic silver medalists for Sweden
Olympic medalists in handball
Medalists at the 2012 Summer Olympics
Swedish expatriate sportspeople in Germany
Swedish expatriate sportspeople in Hungary
IFK Skövde players
Veszprém KC players
Expatriate handball players
Handball-Bundesliga players
Sportspeople from Skåne County
21st-century Swedish people